Carlos Eduardo Mendoza (born February 18, 1970) is a United States district judge of the United States District Court for the Middle District of Florida and former Florida Circuit Court judge.

Biography

Mendoza enlisted in the United States Marine Corps after graduation from high school and participated in combat operations during Operation Desert Shield and Operation Desert Storm. He received an Associate of Arts degree in 1991 from Central Florida Community College. He received a Bachelor of Arts degree, magna cum laude, in 1993 from West Virginia University. He received a Juris Doctor in 1997 from the West Virginia University College of Law. He began his legal career by serving as a Judge Advocate in the Judge Advocate General's Corps of the United States Navy from 1997 to 2005. From 2005 to 2008, he was an Assistant State Attorney in the Seventh Judicial Circuit of Florida. From 2008 to 2011, he served as an Assistant City Attorney for St. Augustine, Florida. From 2011 to 2014, he served as a Circuit Court Judge in the Seventh Judicial Circuit.

Federal judicial service

On February 6, 2014, President Barack Obama nominated Mendoza to serve as a United States District Judge of the United States District Court for the Middle District of Florida, to the seat vacated by Judge John Antoon, who assumed senior status on June 3, 2013. He received a hearing before the United States Senate Judiciary Committee on April 1, 2014. On May 8, 2014 his nomination was reported out of committee by voice vote. On June 19, 2014 Senate Majority Leader Harry Reid filed a motion to invoke cloture on the nomination. On June 23, 2014 the United States Senate voted 53–31 to invoke cloture. On Tuesday June 24, 2014 the United States Senate voted 94–0 in favor of final confirmation. He received his judicial commission on June 27, 2014.

See also
List of Hispanic/Latino American jurists

References

External links

1970 births
Living people
Assistant United States Attorneys
Florida lawyers
Florida state court judges
Hispanic and Latino American judges
Judges of the United States District Court for the Middle District of Florida
State attorneys
United States district court judges appointed by Barack Obama
United States Marine Corps officers
United States Marine Corps reservists
United States Navy officers
West Virginia University College of Law alumni
21st-century American judges